The 2015–16 Latvian Hockey League season was the 25th season of the Latvian Hockey League, the top level of ice hockey in Latvia. Seven teams participated in the league, and HK Liepāja won the championship.

Regular season

Playoffs

References

External links
 Latvian Ice Hockey Federation

Latvian Hockey League
Latvian Hockey League seasons
Latvian